Bryan Pearson may refer to:

 Bryan Pearson (politician) (1934–2016), Canadian politician
 Bryan Pearson (businessman), CEO and President of LoyaltyOne
 Bryan Pearson (character), a character from the sitcom The Bill Engvall Show

See also 
 Brian Pearson (disambiguation)